Cobitis trichonica is a species of ray-finned fish in the family Cobitidae.
It is found only in Greece.

It is threatened by water abstraction.  This species is short-lived and lives in lakes and lowland water courses with little current.

Sources

 Fish Base

Cobitis
Freshwater fish of Europe
Fish described in 1974
Taxonomy articles created by Polbot
Taxa named by Alexander I. Stephanidis